Ablemothrips is a genus of thrips in the family Phlaeothripidae. It occurs in Asia, with two species recorded from Thailand and one species occurring in India, southern Japan, the Philippines, and Taiwan.

Species
 Ablemothrips breviceps
 Ablemothrips longiceps
 Ablemothrips maxillatus

References

Phlaeothripidae
Thrips
Thrips genera